Cathy Gillen Thacker is an American author of over seventy romance novels.

Biography
Thacker began writing to occupy herself while she was raising small children.  She wrote seven books as she taught herself how to be an author.  Her eighth attempt was finally published in July 1982.   She has written over seventy novels since then, which have been published in seventeen languages and thirty-five countries.

Thacker is a charter member of Romance Writers of America. She and her husband Charlie have three children, Julie, David, and Sarah.

Bibliography

Too Many Dads
 Baby on the Doorstep (1994)
 Daddy to the Rescue (1994)
 Too Many Moms (1994)

Wild West Weddings
 The Cowboy's Bride (1996)
 The Ranch Stud (1996)
 The Maverick Marriage (1996)
 One Hot Cowboy (1997)
 Spur-Of-The-Moment Marriage (1997)

McCabe Family
 Dr. Cowboy (1999)
 Wildcat Cowboy (1999)
 A Cowboy's Woman (1999)
 A Cowboy Kind of Daddy (1999)
 Texas Vows (2001)
 The Ultimate Texas Bachelor (2005)
 Santa's Texas Lullaby (2005)
 A Texas Wedding Vow (2006)
 Blame It On Texas (2006)
 A Laramie, Texas Christmas (2006)
 From Texas, With Love (2007)

Brides of Holly Springs
 The Virgin's Secret Marriage (2003)
 The Secret Wedding Wish (2004)
 The Secret Seduction (2004)
 Plain Jane's Secret Life (2004)
 Her Secret Valentine (2005)

Deveraux Legacy
 Her Bachelor Challenge (2002)
 His Marriage Bonus (2002)
 My Secret Wife (2002)
 Their Instant Baby (2002)
 The Heiress (2003)
 Taking Over the Tycoon (2003)

Lockhart Women Series
 The Bride Said, I Did? (2000)
 The Bride Said, Finally! (2000)
 The Bride Said, Surprise! (2001)
 The Virgin Bride Said, Wow! (2001)

Texas Legacies: Carrigans
 The Rancher Next Door (2007)
 The Rancher's Family Thanksgiving  (2007)
 The Rancher's Christmas Baby (2007)
 The Gentleman Rancher (2008)

Made in Texas
 Hannah's Baby (2008)
 The Inherited Twins (2008)
 A Baby In The Bunkhouse (2008)
 Found: One Baby (2009)

The Lonestar Dad’s Club
 A Baby for Mommy (2009)
 A Mommy for Christmas (2009)
 Wanted: One Mommy (2010)
 The Mommy Proposal (2010)

Texas Legacies: The McCabes
 A Cowboy Under the Mistletoe (2010)
 One Wild Cowboy (2011)
 A Cowboy to Marry (2011)

Stand Alone Novels
Touch of Fire (1983)
Intimate Scoundrels (1983)
Wildfire Trace (1984)
Heart's Journey (1985)
Embrace Me Love (1985)
Promise Me Today (1985)
A Private Passion (1985)
Reach for the Stars (1985)
A Family to Cherish (1986)
Heaven Shared (1986)
The Devlin Dare (1986)
Family to Treasure (1987)
Rogue's Bargain (1987)
Family Affair (1988)
Guardian Angel (1988)
Fatal Amusement (1988)
Natural Touch (1988)
Dream Spinners (1988)
Perfect Match (1988)
One Man's Folly (1989)
Lifetime Guarantee (1989)
Meant to Be (1990)
Slalom to Terror (1990)
It's Only Temporary (1990)
Father of the Bride (1991)
An Unexpected Family (1991)
Tangled Web (1992)
Home Free (1992)
Anything's Possible (1992)
Honeymoon for Hire (1993)
Beguiled Again (1993)
Fiance for Sale (1993)
Kidnapping Nick (1993)
Guilty as Sin (1994)
Baby on the Doorstep (1994)
Daddy to the Rescue (1994)
Jenny and the Fortune Hunter (1994)
Too Many Mums (1994)
Love Potion 5 (1994)
A Shotgun Wedding (1995)
Miss Charlotte Surrenders (1995)
Matchmaking Baby (1995)
Daddy Christmas (1995)
Mathmaking Baby (1996)
The Cowboy's Bride (1996)
The Ranch Stud (1996)
The Maverick Marriage (1996)
How to Marry...One Hot Cowboy (1997)
Spur-of-the-moment Marriage (1997)
Snowbound Bride (1998)
Hot Chocolate Honeymoon (1998)
Snow Baby (1998)
The Cowboy's Mistress (1998)
Make Room for Baby (1998)
Baby's First Christmas (1998)
His Cinderella (1999)
A Baby by Chance (2000)
Texas Vows (2001)
Return to Crystal Creek (2002) (with Bethany Campbell and Vicki Lewis Thompson)
Lost and Found (2003)
Twice and for Always (2003)
The Heiress (2003)
Blame It on Texas (2006)
Christmas Lullaby (2006)
A Laramie, Texas Christmas (2006)
From Texas, With Love (2007)

Omnibus
Marriage by Design (1994)
Yours, Mine And Ours (1997) (with Marisa Carroll, Penny Jordan)
The Cupid Connection (1998) (with Anne Stuart and Vicki Lewis Thompson)
In Defense of Love / Her Special Angel / Daddy Christmas / Home for Christmas (1999) (with Kathleen Creighton, Marie Ferrarella)
The Baby Game (2000) (with Judy Christenberry)
Western Rogues (2002) (with Annette Broadrick)
Temporary Santa (2003) (with Leigh Michaels)
Her Surprise Baby (2004) (with Paula Detmer Riggs)
Special Delivery (2004) (with Maggie Shayne)
Her Bachelor Challenge / His Marriage Bonus (2004)
My Secret Wife / Their Instant Baby (2004)
Be My Baby (2005) (with Adrianne Lee)
Married in White (2005) (with Linda O. Johnston)
Bride Said, Surprise! / Bride Said, Wow! (2005)
Secret Wedding Wish / the Sugar House (2005) (with Christine Flynn)
Secret Seduction / Which Child is Mine? (2005) (with Karen Rose Smith)
Plain Jane's Secret Life / Beauty and the Black Sheep (2005) (with Jessica Bird)

External links
Cathy Gillen Thacker official website

Living people
20th-century American novelists
21st-century American novelists
American romantic fiction writers
Year of birth missing (living people)
American women novelists
Women romantic fiction writers
20th-century American women writers
Place of birth missing (living people)
21st-century American women writers